= Dhieu Mathok =

South Sudanese politician

Dhieu Mathok Diing Wol is a South Sudanese politician and the former Minister of Investment in the Revitalized Transitional Government of National Unity (R-TGoNU), Republic of South Sudan, where he serverd from March 2020 until October 2025.

He also served as Secretary of South Sudan Mediation Committee on Sudanese Peace Talks in Juba.

He served as a minister, in the Ministry of Energy and Dams in 2016 up to 2020.

Currently Board Chairman of the African Centre for Conflict Resolution and Peace Building (ACCRPB) Wol holds a PhD in Peace and Development Studies from the University of Juba. He also holds a postdoctoral degree in Conflict Resolution and Peace Building from Atlantic International University (AIU) in, USA.

Wol began his academic career at the University of Juba as an assistant professor, advancing to the position of associate professor of Conflict Resolution and Peace Building in 2012. He played a significant role in relocating the Center for Peace and Development Studies from Khartoum to Juba and actively participated in curriculum development initiatives.

Wol has been extensively involved in various peace initiatives as a Negotiator and sometimes a Mediator . He played key roles in notable agreements such as the Comprehensive Peace Agreement (CPA) in Kenya from 2001 to 2005, the Agreement on Resolution of Conflict in South Sudan (ARCSS) in Addis Ababa from 2013 to 2015, and the Revitalized Agreement on Resolution of Conflict in South Sudan (R-ARCSS) in Addis Ababa and Khartoum from 2017 to 2018. Additionally, he served as the secretary for the Sudan Peace Mediation Committee, which brokered the Juba Peace Agreement among Sudanese warring parties in Juba in 2020. He later served as the Secretary of the Fact-Finding Committee between the Nyok Dinka-Twic Conflict in South Sudan 2022. He has facilitated grassroots peace conferences between the Dinka-Messeriyia-Riziegat (DMR) tribes. His doctoral thesis revived the concept of annual peace conferences in the DMR communities, reminiscent of practices during the Anglo-Egyptian colonial rule. In 2012, he was invited by the African Union Team of Experts (AUTE) to advise on border disputes, particularly the Mile 14 enclave. Dr. Wol has also participated on the IGAD roster of technical experts in mediation and mediation support under the IGAD Mediation Unit.

Wol has published extensively on conflict resolution, peacebuilding and border disputes. His works, including "Politics of Ethnic Discrimination in Sudan: A Justification for the Secession of South Sudan", "Pastoralism, Boundaries and Disputes: Administration and Conflict Management in the Mile 14" and "National Identity Reconfiguration in South Sudan: Strengths and Weaknesses", are widely regarded as seminal contributions to the field.
